James Jude Forbes (born April 1, 1955), often credited as James Jude or his better-known name, Jim Forbes, is an American writer, producer and correspondent, and the narrator for VH1's Behind the Music.

Forbes has contributed as a producer/director/writer for networks including CNN, Fox, PBS, VH1, ESPN, and E! as well as programmers including Telepictures and United Television.

Education

He received his  BS in journalism 1977 from New York University with minors in history and political science.
Additional studies include: Northwestern University, 1973–74, Syracuse University, 1975, and New School of Social Research, 1978

Background
Forbes began his career as an investigative reporter for local television stations in New Mexico, Oklahoma, Connecticut and Los Angeles. He covered significant events including from the New Mexico State Penitentiary riot in 1980 and the LA Riots of 1992.

Forbes formed his own production company in 1988. He continued his on-air work, hosting and working as a correspondent and produce and writing.
Forbes also narrates documentary programming, including VH1’s Emmy-nominated series, Behind The Music, ESPN’s Emmy winning Sports Century as well as series for various networks and channels. In December 2007, Forbes narrated a DVD documentary of the thoroughbred racehorse Lava Man that was a stadium giveaway at Hollywood Park Racetrack.  Forbes narrated the Emmy winning 2000 season finale of The Simpsons, and episodes of Saturday Night Live, The Tonight Show, Late Night, Jimmy Kimmel Live!, The Chris Rock Show, Chris Isaac Show, How I Met Your Mother and The Rosie O'Donnell Show. He is the featured exhibit voice of the recently renovated Basketball Hall of Fame in Springfield, Massachusetts.

Awards

He received an ALMA Award for “Best Made for Television Documentary” for producing/directing and writing Selena, Behind the Music.

References

 CESD profile page
 www.jimforbes.tv
 
 Behind the Story (Discovery Channel MythBusters spoof)

1955 births
Living people
Syracuse University alumni